King Kong is a Peruvian cuisine dessert. It is made of cookies (made from flour, butter, eggs and milk), filled with Peruvian blancmange, some pineapple sweet and in some cases peanuts, with cookies within its layers. It is sold in one-half and one kilogram sizes. It is known as part of the culture of Lambayeque Region and nowadays the makers of the dessert are grouped in the  King Kong and Typical desserts Producers Association of Lambayeque City.

History
History tells us that by the 1930s, the famous movie King Kong, was being shown in the city. Popular citizens compared the mold and size of the sweet with the figure of the big gorilla, baptizing it since then with the name of King Kong. Previously it was known as «Alfajor de Trujillo»  and had a circular shape, however the "King Kong" is usually rectangular but circular presentations can be found on the market. Nowadays there are many factories that specialize in making this sweet, the most recognized being the company San Roque and "Lambayeque fabrica de dulces", "Huerequeque", "Evocada", and "Tumbas Reales" among others.

See also
Chiclayo
Trujillo

References

Peruvian cuisine
Brand name confectionery